Eucalyptus × chrysantha is a mallee that is endemic to Western Australia. It is a putative hybrid between E. preissiana and E. sepulcralis and has lance-shaped to curved adult leaves, flower buds in groups of between three and six, white to yellow flowers and cylindrical to urn-shaped fruit.

Description
Flowering occurs between August and December and the flowers are white to yellow.

Taxonomy and naming
This eucalypt was first formally described in 1938 by William Blakely and Henry Steedman who gave it the name Eucalyptus chrysantha and published the description in Journal and Proceedings of the Linnean Society of New South Wales. It is a presumed hybrid between E. preissiana and E. sepulcralis. The specific epithet (chrysantha) is derived from the Ancient Greek words chrysos meaning "gold" and anthos meaning "flower".

Distribution and habitat
Eucalyptus × chrysantha grows on flats and around rocky outcrops in the Fitzgerald River National Park.

Conservation status
This mallee is classified as "Priority Two" by the Western Australian Government Department of Parks and Wildlife, meaning that it is poorly known and from only one or a few locations.

References

chrysantha
Myrtales of Australia
Eucalypts of Western Australia
Plants described in 1938
Taxa named by William Blakely
Plant nothospecies